Tommy Mac may refer to:
Tommy Mac (musician)
Tommy Mac (carpenter)